GP Internacional do Guadiana is a road bicycle race held annually in Portugal. It is organized as a 2.2 event on the UCI Europe Tour.

Winners

References

UCI Europe Tour races
Cycle races in Portugal
Recurring sporting events established in 2015
2015 establishments in Portugal
Spring (season) events in Portugal
Defunct cycling races in Portugal